The 1952–53 daytime network television schedule for the four major English-language commercial broadcast networks in the United States covers most of the weekday daytime hours from September 1952 to August 1953.

Talk shows are highlighted in  yellow, local programming is white, reruns of prime-time programming are orange, game shows are pink, soap operas are chartreuse, news programs are gold and all others are light blue. New series are highlighted in bold.

Fall 1952

Winter 1952-1953

Spring 1953

Summer 1953

By network

ABC

Not Returning From 1951-52
The Clock
The Dennis James Show
The Frances Langford-Don Ameche Show
The Gayelord Hauser Show
The Paul Dixon Show

CBS

Returning Series
Action in the Afternoon
Arthur Godfrey Time
As the World Turns
The Big Payoff
The Bill Cullen Show
The Bob Crosby Show
Break the Bank
Bride and Groom
CBS News
CBS Evening News
The Edge of Night
Face the Nation
Freedom Rings
The Garry Moore Show
The Guiding Light
Homemaker's Exchange
Love of Life
Mike and Buff
Search for Tomorrow
Strike It Rich
Summer School
The U.N. in Action
Walter Cronkite with the News

New Series
Art Linkletter's House Party
The Bil Baird Show
Double or Nothing
Rod Brown of the Rocket Rangers
There's One in Every Family
Wheel of Fortune

Not Returning From 1951-52
The Al Pearce Show
Bert Parks Show
The Dennis James Show
The Egg and I
The First Hundred Years
Gayelord Hauser Show
Meet Your Cover Girl
The Mel Torme Show
Morning News
The Steve Allen Show
Your Surprise Store

NBC

Returning Series
The Big Payoff
The Bill Cullen Show
Howdy Doody
The Kate Smith Hour
Meet the Press
NBC News Update
Strike It Rich (radio only)

New Series
Atom Squad
The Bennetts
Ding Dong School
Follow Your Heart
The Gabby Hayes Show
Glamour Girl
Ladies Choice
Three Steps to Heaven
The Today Show
Welcome Travelers

Not Returning From 1951-52
The Bill Goodwin Show
Breakfast Party
The Bunch
Dave & Charlie
Here's Looking at You
It's a Problem
It's In the Bag
The Johnny Dugan Show
Kovacs on the Corner
Matinee in New York
The Ralph Edwards Show
Richard Harkness News Review
Ruth Lyons|Ruth Lyons 50 Club
Vacation Wonderland
Winner Take All

DuMont

New Series
Ladie's Date
One Woman's Experience

See also
1952-53 United States network television schedule (prime-time)

Sources
https://web.archive.org/web/20071015122215/http://curtalliaume.com/abc_day.html
https://web.archive.org/web/20071015122235/http://curtalliaume.com/cbs_day.html
https://web.archive.org/web/20071012211242/http://curtalliaume.com/nbc_day.html

United States weekday network television schedules
1952 in American television
1953 in American television